Brent Paris was a judge who served on the Tax Court of Canada.  Prior to his appointment in December 2002, he was the Director of the Tax Law Services Section in the British Columbia Regional Office of Justice Canada.

Justice Paris resigned effective April 3, 2019 as stated in the April 17, 2019 Government of Canada News Release announcing the appointment of Mr. David E. Spiro to the Tax Court of Canada.

References

Living people
Judges of the Tax Court of Canada
Year of birth missing (living people)